The Council of Ministers of Lebanon is the executive body of the Republic of Lebanon.  Its president is the Prime Minister of Lebanon, and it is appointed by the President of Lebanon and the Prime Minister of Lebanon. The appointed government also has to pass a confidence vote in the Parliament of Lebanon. As stipulated in Article 95 of the Lebanese constitution, there are two requirements for the council of ministers to be considered constitutional:

1-It has to be composed of an equal number of muslim and christian ministers

2-The different sects of Lebanon shall be represented in a just and equitable manner in the formation of the Cabinet.  

The Council of Ministers is considered to be the "government" of Lebanon by the Constitution.

History 
The body was created on 23 May 1926, when the Constitution of the state of Greater Lebanon was promulgated.  From the creation of the office in 1926 to the end of the Civil War, the Constitution made little mention of the roles and duties of the office, albeit for a mention of the President to "nominate one of the ministers as Prime Ministers".  Following the end of the Lebanese Civil War and the ratification of the Ta'if Accord, the responsibilities of the Council of Ministers were significantly strengthened, codified and clearly listed in the Constitution.  Notably, the accord shifted the executive power from the President to the Council.

Formation of a Government 
The Council is formed by a Decree of the President of the Republic, which is countersigned by the Prime Minister.  Within 30 days, the Chamber of Deputies must approve the Government through a vote of confidence, which requires a simple majority.  By Article 64 of the Lebanese Constitution, it is the Prime Minister who assumes the negotiations with the Parliament for the formation of a government.  By custom, the government is composed equally between Muslims and Christians - however, this is not a requirement specified in the Constitution.

Resignation of the Cabinet 
According to Article 69 of the Constitution, the government is considered resigned when:

 The Prime Minister resigns or dies.
 It loses more than a third of its members, as prescribed in its original decree of formation.
 When a new President takes office.
 At the beginning of a new term of the Chamber of Deputies.
 When the Chamber of Deputies has a vote of no confidence in the Cabinet, either by the initiative of the Cabinet or the Chamber.
 The President of the Republic fires the Prime Minister.

Caretaker government 
When the government is considered resigned (as per the conditions set above), or has not yet received a vote of confidence from the Chamber of Deputies, it can only operate "in the narrow sense of conducting the business".

In addition, the cabinet is a caretaker government when the term of the President of the Republic expires and the Parliament has not yet elected a new President.  For example, this was the case for 2 years upon the expiration of President Michel Suleiman's term in 2014 up until the election of Michel Aoun on 31 October 2016, with Prime Minister Tammam Salam acting as its Head.

Responsibilities and powers 
The council is generally tasked with overseeing daily affairs, and preparing bills for the House of Deputies to vote on.  The individual ministers work on their own portfolios, and only need the signature of the President and the Prime Minister for decisions concerning their individual ministry.  When decisions affect the entire government, a majority of the ministers are needed.  For the government to consent on so-called "basic" issues (constitutional amendments, electoral laws, dissolving parliament, war and peace, intl. treaties, state of emergency, state budget, long-term development plans, appointing first-cadre state employees, redistricting, nationality laws, personal affairs law, dismissing ministers) a 2/3 majority of the ministers present is needed.

The following is a list of the powers of the Council of Ministers:

 Forming bills for the legislature to vote on.  It elaborates the public agenda, and takes the necessary decisions for the implementation of the bills adopted by the House of Deputies.
 Acquiesce on the decision of the President to dissolve the Parliament.
 Consent on the President's ratification of international treaties.
 Approve the dismissal of a minister by the President.
 Oversee all civil, military, and security administrations.
 It is the power to which the Armed Forces are subjected (however, the President is the commander-in-chief and thus has the final say).

Powers in relation to the President 
Prior to the Ta'if Accord, the role of Council was to give the President its "favourable advice" rather than a clear consensus/majority on the issues prescribed above.  Nevertheless, as the president is the sole person who can nominate/remove the ministers and the entire government, it is bound to be favorable to him or her.  In addition, the Constitution is silent on the issue of retaliation - where if the President has the authority to fire the government and sign a decree it did not approve of - however this issue has never arisen since the Cabinet generally deferential to the President (or vice versa).

Meetings and quorum 
The President of the Council of Ministers is the Prime Minister.  He heads the meetings and calls ordinary meetings.  Whenever the president attends, however, he chairs the meetings (but without voting on its decisions).  In addition, the President can place any item he deems to be "urgent" on the agenda and order extraordinary sessions.

The quorum for a meeting is 2/3 of the ministers, and its decisions are taken by those present (voting by proxy is not allowed).

Secterian representation controversies 
There has been several controversies relating to sectarian groups and the power to topple the government.  For example, in 2006, Hezbollah began mass demonstrations as all 5 Shiite and 1 Christian from resigned from the 24 member cabinet (2 short of the 1/3 needed to bring down the government) of Prime Minister Fouad Siniora.  This meant that there was effectively no Shiite representation in the Cabinet and a Christian majority.  Nevertheless, the government continued to function for another 2 years until incumbent President Emile Lahoud's term ended in 2008.

September 2021 Cabinet

See also
List of Cabinets of Lebanon

References

Politics of Lebanon